Trigonopterus porcatus is a species of flightless weevil in the genus Trigonopterus from Indonesia.

Etymology
The specific name is derived from the Latin word porca, meaning "the ridge between two furrows".  It refers to the texture of the elytra.

Description
Individuals measure 2.15–2.63 mm in length.  General coloration is black, with rust-colored legs and head.

Range

Phylogeny
T. porcatus is part of the T. dimorphus species group.

References

porcatus
Beetles described in 2014
Beetles of Asia
Insects of Indonesia